The III Tour was a concert tour by American hard rock band Van Halen, in support of their eleventh studio album, Van Halen III. It is the only concert tour to feature vocalist Gary Cherone.

Background
Despite positive critical reviews, the tour underperformed commercially by Van Halen standards, and capped the band's general decline after the early 1990s. It would be their last tour until 2004.

In a change from Sammy Hagar-era tours, Gary Cherone – who had grown up a big fan of the band – was willing to include material from both previous Van Halen vocalists. Due to both differing vocal styles and personal animus between himself and David Lee Roth, Hagar had allowed only a few Roth-era classics into the set lists while he sang for Van Halen. Cherone's voice was deeper than Hagar's, making it more suited to Roth songs, yet he possessed enough vocal range to perform Hagar songs as well. (When Roth rejoined Van Halen in 2007, no Hagar-era material graced the set lists.) "It may have looked odd on paper but it actually worked live," Cherone told KNAC. "I made a concerted effort to do the old Van Halen tunes that Sammy was not doing. I wanted to do the deep cuts… we did songs their fans had not heard in years."

However, dissatisfaction with the new album and the band's troubles in 1996 (arguments over Hagar's sudden departure, followed by a brief reunion with Roth that also ended abruptly) led to the tour's low popularity. Grunge had changed the face of rock music, and Van Halen's fame – which had endured due to their heritage – took a big hit with Hagar's departure.

A 15-date European tour planned for the end of May and June had to be cancelled after four shows only due to Alex Van Halen's injury. The band also cancelled all of their 4 September dates in Brazil and Puerto Rico. 

The April 20 show in Sydney, Australia was recorded live for an MTV special, Live from the 10 Spot. It aired on May 1, 1998.

Setlist

"Unchained"
"Without You"
"One I Want"
"Mean Street"
"When It's Love"
"Fire in the Hole"
"Why Can't This Be Love"
"Romeo Delight"
"Alex Van Halen Drum Solo"
"Dance the Night Away"
"Feel Your Love Tonight"
"Humans Being"
"Somebody Get Me a Doctor"
"Year to the Day"
"Eddie Van Halen Guitar Solo"
"Right Now"
"Ain't Talkin' Bout Love"
Encore 1
"Josephina"
"Panama"
"Jump"
Encore 2
"I'm the One"

Tour dates

Box office score data

Personnel
 Eddie Van Halen – guitar, backing vocals
 Michael Anthony – bass, backing vocals, keyboards
 Alex Van Halen – drums
 Gary Cherone – lead vocals

Additional musician
 Alan Fitzgerald – keyboards

References

External links 
 Van-Halen.com – The official Van Halen website
 Van Halen NewsDesk

1998 concert tours
Van Halen concert tours